John Cranna (born 1954, in Te Aroha) is a New Zealand novelist, who won the Commonwealth Writers' Prize, Best First Book, and the New Zealand Book Award for Fiction for Visitors.

Life
He grew up in the Waikato, New Zealand. He received a BA Honours in Politics and Sociology from Victoria University of Wellington, then moved to the UK where he lived in Kings Cross, London during the 1980s. Kings Cross was a renowned red light and crime district at the time, and he worked in urban development and renewal for nine years in this impoverished inner city area while completing his first book of short stories. He returned to New Zealand in 1987.  His works of fiction are published in Australia by Heinemann Reed, in the UK by Minerva Books, and in France by Éditions Phébus.
He was editor of AA Directions, from 2000 to 2005, which at the time, was New Zealand's largest circulation magazine. He was also Chair of the Auckland Society of Authors for four years. 
He established and previously taught at the Auckland University of Technology, Centre for Modern Writing where he established the Masters of Creative Writing degree. He was voted Best Post Graduate Supervisor by students at the University in 2008. He is now Director of John Cranna Communications, a communications consultancy, and The Creative Hub, a creative writing centre in the Auckland CBD, which he founded in 2010. The Creative Hub now has over 800 graduates, and employs a number of leading New Zealand writers to tutor and mentor students. These teachers have included four winners of the Prime Minister's Award for Literary Achievement: Roger Hall, Fiona Kidman, Owen Marshall and Elizabeth Smither  John Cranna also provides international online creative writing coaching via www.creativewriting.coach 

He was screenwriter for the short Accidents (2000), directed by Paul Swadel, which was shown at the 56th Venice International Film Festival.

Works
Visitors, Heinemann Reed, 1989,  
Arena, Minerva, 1992,

References

External links
"Books: Get a decent haircut and move to Auckland", Star Times, 04/11/2007

New Zealand male novelists
1954 births
Living people
20th-century New Zealand novelists
People from Te Aroha
Academic staff of the Auckland University of Technology
20th-century New Zealand male writers